The Italian Straw Hat (French: Un chapeau de paille d'Italie) may refer to:

 The Italian Straw Hat (play), original name Un chapeau de paille d'Italie, an 1851 five-act farce by Eugène Marin Labiche and Marc-Michel
 The Italian Straw Hat (film), original name Un chapeau de paille d'Italie, a 1928 French silent film adaptation
 Un chapeau de paille d'Italie, a 1941 French film adaptation by Jacques Chabannes and Maurice Cammage, directed by Cammage